WJDM (1520 AM Radio Cantico Nuevo) is a radio station licensed to Mineola, New York, broadcasting a Spanish language Christian radio format. The station is owned by Cantico Nuevo Ministry, Inc.

WJDM broadcasts during daytime hours only, from local sunrise to sunset in order to protect WWKB in Buffalo, New York, a clear-channel station on the same frequency that can frequently be heard in the New York City area after dark.

The station went silent on January 25, 2018, after being evicted from their transmitter site. It resumed broadcasting on January 15, 2019, in order to keep the station's license from being cancelled and the call letters deleted by the FCC.

In February 2019, Cantico Nuevo Ministry filed a $200,000 deal to purchase WTHE from Universal Broadcasting of New York. The purchase was consummated on November 14, 2019, at a price of $200,000.

The call letters were changed to WJDM from WTHE on May 27, 2021. The WJDM call letters had previously belonged to another Cantico Nuevo station, 1530 AM in Elizabeth, New Jersey, which had its license cancelled in 2020.

References

External links
 

 
 
 

Mass media in Nassau County, New York
Radio stations established in 1949
1949 establishments in New York (state)
JDM
JDM
Spanish-language radio stations in New York (state)
Mineola, New York